MediaWorks New Zealand is a New Zealand-based company specialising in radio, outdoor advertising and interactive media. It is jointly owned by U.S. company Oaktree Capital Management and out-of-home advertising company QMS. It operates nine national radio brands, twelve websites and one locally operated radio station.

On 1 December 2020, MediaWorks sold its entire television division, MediaWorks TV to Discovery, Inc. and the subsidiary company, MediaWorks TV Limited was renamed Discovery NZ Limited (now Warner Bros. Discovery NZ Limited).

History

Television

MediaWorks TV was created in 2004 following the merger of TVWorks and RadioWorks, and owned the nationwide free-to-air television channels TV3 and C4.

On 7 September 2020, MediaWorks confirmed that it would be selling its entire television arm including Three, Bravo, The Edge TV, Breeze TV, streaming service ThreeNow, and current affairs service Newshub to Discovery, Inc.

The acquisition of MediaWorks TV by Discovery, Inc. was completed on 1 December 2020.

In November 2021, Discovery NZ, Ltd announced it would be ending its agreement with MediaWorks to broadcast The Edge TV and Breeze TV services and would be relaunching the channels.

Radio

MediaWorks Radio has its origins as a Taranaki-based radio company Energy Enterprises. Energy Enterprises was started in the 1980s when local station Energy FM was started in Taranaki. During the 1980s and 1990s Energy Enterprises expanded their operation by starting up new stations around the North Island of New Zealand or taking over existing privately owned stations. In the late 1990s Energy Enterprises amalgamated with Radio Pacific and became known as Pacific/RadioWorks Group. The company purchased seven North Island stations owned by Dunedin-based Radio Otago in 1997 allowing Radio Otago to expand their operations to other markets in the South Island. The two companies Radio Otago and Pacific/RadioWorks group merged in 1999 to become RadioWorks.

The merger of RadioWorks and Radio Otago allowed RadioWorks to expand their North Island stations into the South Island. By 1999 RadioWorks consisted of The Edge FM and The Rock (two stations that were originally Hamilton based), Solid Gold, Radio Pacific and a collection of local one-off stations in each market. Some markets even had more than one local station. From 1999 onward, all of the local stations were marketed as LocalWorks stations. Between 2000 and 2001, CanWest purchased RadioWorks, awaiting company restructuring before completing the year-long takeover, and moved its existing MORE FM group assets, including Channel Z and The Breeze Wellington, into the company.

In 2004, CanWest Global Communications combined television company TVWorks and radio company RadioWorks to form the new MediaWorks company. On 29 July 2004, 30% of this new company was sold on the NZSX. Three years later, in July 2007, CanWest sold its stake of the company to Ironbridge Capital, a group of Australian investors, who subsequently obtained the remaining 30% from other investors.

In 2011, MediaWorks received a $43 million loan guarantee for the Government to renew its licenses until 2030. The deal went against official advice, and then Communications Minister Steven Joyce was accused of having a conflict of interest as the past managing director of the company's RadioWorks division. The loan was described by AUT's Centre for Journalism, Media and Democracy as a form of corporate welfare, and was criticised by blogger Sarah Miles as a case of governmental interference in the media. Among other companies, Radio Bay of Plenty secured commercial loans, The Radio Network covered its own costs, and Rhema Broadcasting Group covered the cost with no-interest loans.

The US-based Oaktree Capital Management bought $125 million of loans to MediaWorks in 2012. These were converted to equity in 2013. In June 2013, with over NZ$700 million in debt, MediaWorks NZ was put into receivership. It came out of receivership in November 2013. Oaktree Capital Management took 100% ownership of the business in 2015.

In August 2014, Mark Weldon was appointed CEO, replacing Susan Turner, who had resigned in July 2014. Weldon resigned in May 2016 at the same time that a large number of long serving and high-profile staff were leaving the company under his leadership. CFO David Chalmers replaced him in an acting capacity.

Since its inception in 2004, MediaWorks has moved its local stations over to More FM and The Breeze network; all these stations now carry the network branding and some or all of the network's programming. At the same time, MediaWorks have rolled out new networks Radio Live and Kiwi FM, converted Radio Pacific to LiveSport, and purchased networks Mai FM and George FM. MediaWorks owns Times FM in Orewa, Coromandel FM on the Coromandel Peninsula and Radio Dunedin in Otago.

All MediaWorks-owned and -affiliated stations read or carry Newshub updates hourly or half hourly during their weekday breakfast programmes. Most also carry pre-recorded news and sports updates hourly at other times. RadioLive News took over from the RadioWorks news service, Global News, with the launch of Radio Live in 2005; RadioLive was incorporated into Newshub in 2016.

In October 2021, MediaWorks said it would be ending its content supply agreement with Newshub. MediaWorks announced it would instead establish its own radio newsroom again and would employ over 20 news and sports journalists, editors and correspondents.

In November 2021, MediaWorks announced it would replace Magic Talk with a new talk radio network called Today FM which launched on 21 March 2022. Newshub's political editor at the time, Tova O'Brien, was announced as breakfast host, with broadcasters Duncan Garner, Rachel Smalley, Polly Gillespie, Leah Panapa, Mark Richardson, Lloyd Burr, Wilhelmina Shrimpton, Nigel Yalden, Robett Hollis, Mark Dye, Carly Flynn, Nickson Clark, Dave Letele and Dominic Bowden all named as part of the lineup.

In December 2021, MediaWorks announced it had acquired Humm FM and its existing frequency (106.2 FM).

On 1 January 2022, The Rock moved from 90.2 FM to 106.2 FM in Auckland and is currently simulcast on both frequencies until the launch of Today FM (on 90.2 FM). In addition to Auckland, Today FM broadcasts on FM frequencies nationwide, including
the new frequency of 95.3 FM in Christchurch (moving Mai FM to 106.8 FM).

Rova

Rova (stylised rova) is a digital audio streaming app for Android and iOS. Launched in January 2017, it hosts live streams of radio stations The Edge, The Breeze, More FM, Mai FM, George FM, The Sound, Magic and Today FM. It also hosts music channels such as Breeze Relax, Chill Hop, The Edge Fresh Hits, George Biggest Bangers, High School Hits (More FM), Kiwi Discovery, Magic Classic Country, Mai Heatseekers, The Rock Kiwi Rock, The Sound Deep Cuts and so on. Podcasts are also available on the app, both of radio shows (e.g. The Edge Breakfast, Mai Morning Crew, The Morning Rumble from The Rock, Tova from Today FM etc) and content created for rova (e.g. The Core with Wilhelmina Shrimpton, Stream Queens, Talking Out the Trash, Tic-Heads, The Trainee Sexologist etc), as well as partner podcasts (e.g. The Beauty School Dropouts Podcast, The Daily Poem, Fight for the Wild, Grey Areas with Petra Bagust etc). It also occasionally has pop-up channels used for the radio stations' promotions (e.g. The Edge Rewind, The Rock's Vanilla Rock etc).

On 3 July 2017, rova All Day Breakfast with Polly & Grant launched. This was a 3-hour radio show hosted by Polly Gillespie and Grant Kereama, broadcast live 6 am – 9 am weekdays, and repeated in between broadcasts. It was also broadcast on 106.7FM in central Wellington. The show ended in June 2020, as part of MediaWorks making 130 staff redundant because of the COVID-19 pandemic.

Nationwide stations

Since its inception in 2004, MediaWorks have moved its local stations over to the More FM and The Breeze brand; all these broadcasts now carry this branding and some or all of the brand's programming. At the same time, MediaWorks have rolled out new brands Radio Live and Kiwi FM, converted Radio Pacific to LiveSport, and purchased brands Mai FM and George FM. MediaWorks owns Times FM in Orewa, Coromandel FM on the Coromandel Peninsula and Radio Dunedin in Otago.

Radio brands

Defunct/Sold

Local services
Coromandel FM was a regional Coromandel Peninsula radio network with a Hot AC music format and hourly Radio Live News updates. It was officially launched by station manager Warren Male in December 1992, but began as short trial broadcasts on Pauanui-Tairua and Whitianga-Whangamata during previous summers. Under a contract with MediaWorks New Zealand, independent affiliate Coromandel FM Limited also operates The Breeze Mercury Bay and The Rock Mercury Bay from Thames. Coromandel FM is now More FM Coromandel.

Local brands and affiliates

Former

George FM

George FM is a dance music radio station. Seventy-five presenters present the station's twenty-four-hour mix of house, breaks, drum and bass, electro, soul, downbeat, jazz, funk, indietronica, hip-hop and other dance and electronica music. The station is targeted at the 25- to 44-year-old age group.

George FM was set up in 1998 as a volunteer-run low power station based in a Grey Lynn spare bedroom. George FM began broadcasting on a high powered FM frequency in 2001 and became a commercial station with paid staff in 2003. The station was relayed to other centres in later years through the use of low powered frequencies. George FM was available for a while on Sky Digital and since 2007 has broadcast on Freeview. The station was purchased by MediaWorks on 16 February 2009. However, it continues to retain a laid-back style: news is limited to informal Auckland-specific news, weather, traffic and surf reports hourly during breakfast and drive shows and the choice of music and presenting style is entirely that of programme hosts.

George broadcasts on Auckland 96.6 FM and on low powered FM frequencies in other markets around New Zealand. The station was turned into a nationwide brand in 2015 following the purchase of additional frequencies.

Mai FM

Mai FM is an Auckland-based Māori radio network which plays mainly hip hop and R&B music. The station is targeted at under 35-year-old listeners. Mai FM was operated as an iwi radio station by Ngati Whatua subsidiary Mai Media Limited between 1992 and 2008, but MediaWorks New Zealand gained ownership and control of the station from 31 March 2008. Today Mai FM can be heard in eleven markets around the North Island and in Christchurch in the South Island.

Magic

Magic is an oldies music station targeted at the 50- to 69-year-old age group and is currently heard in over 20 markets. The station launched on 20 April 2015. The station launched on frequencies previously used by MediaWorks for other local or network stations.

More FM

More FM is an adult contemporary music station catering to the 25- to 44-year-old listeners and runs a mixture of local and network shows, programming varies between markets. More FM has its origins as local radio stations broadcasting in Auckland, Hamilton, Wellington, Christchurch and Dunedin – the original station was established in Wellington in May 1991. The More FM brand was expanded across all of New Zealand when local stations operated by MediaWorks as More FM, stations initially remained local between 6am and 7pm but local content has been reduced on each station since then. Today, More FM can be heard in 24 markets across New Zealand.

The Sound

The Sound is a classic rock station playing music targeted at the 35- to 59-year-old age group. The station was originally known as Solid Gold and played a Rock N Roll Oldies format, specializing in music from the 1960 and 70s. Solid began in Auckland in 1997 and expanded across New Zealand in the late 90s. The station was rebranded as The Sound on 1 January 2012 and can now be heard in 25 markets across New Zealand.

The Breeze

The Breeze is an easy listening music station catering to 40 – 60-year-old listeners and is targeted mostly at females. The Breeze began in 1993 as an easy listening station in Wellington, there were also local The Breeze stations in Auckland and Hamilton but both stations were closed down and returned some years later. The Breeze in Wellington was originally independently owned and has its origins as Radio Windy which had been on the air since the 1970s.

The Breeze was expanded to other markets after MediaWorks rebranding some of their local easy listening stations as The Breeze, originally retaining local programming. A network was formed in 2007 a year after The Breeze began broadcasting in Auckland with local content reduced on some stations and the brand expanded to new markets. Today, The Breeze can be heard in 18 markets around New Zealand.

The Edge

The Edge is a pop music station catering to 15 – 34-year-old female listeners. The station plays music in the current Top 40 as well as some older tracks. The Edge began in 1994 as a local Hamilton radio station taking over from Buzzard 98FM, both stations actually broadcast on 97.8FM. In 1998 RadioWorks began expanding the station across the North Island and in 1999 following the RadioWorks and Radio Otago merger The Edge was networked into the South Island. In 2001 The Edge was moved to Auckland but did not begin broadcasting there until 2003. Today The Edge is available in 22 markets across New Zealand.

The Rock

The Rock is a modern rock music station playing rock music from the 1980s to today. The station is aimed at the 25 – 44-year-old male audience. The Rock has its origins as a local radio station in Hamilton which began broadcasting on 1 December 1991. The Rock expanded into Taranaki and the Bay of Plenty as separate local stations during the mid-nineties and later began networking to regions around the North Island, replacing the local programming in Taranaki and Bay of Plenty with programming from Hamilton. In 1999 The Rock moved to Auckland and with RadioWorks and Radio Otago merging The Rock was able to expand into the South Island. The Rock is currently available in 26 markets across New Zealand.

Today FM

Today FM is a talkback radio station catered at the 35 – 54-year-old audience.
The station has its origins as Radio Pacific which was an Auckland radio station that began in the 1970s, switched to a talkback format in the 1980s and was networked across all of New Zealand in the 1990s. In 2005, Radio Live was launched focusing on talkback and the Radio Pacific brand remained until 2007 running talkback at breakfast, but outside of that time, it broadcast Radio Trackside horse racing coverage. 
At midnight on 19 January 2019, Radio Live was rebranded as Magic Talk.
At 5am on 22 March 2022, Magic Talk was rebranded as Today FM. 
Today FM can be heard in 28 markets across New Zealand.

Regional stations

Radio Dunedin

Radio Dunedin is a Dunedin radio station broadcasting music from the 1960s, 1970s and 1980s on 1305 AM and 95.4 FM. It claims to be the first radio station in New Zealand, the fifth oldest station in the world and five weeks older than the BBC. Announcers on air during the daytime between 6am and 6pm are employed by MediaWorks and are paid announcers. On weeknights and weekends the Otago Radio Association leases air time to broadcast a variety of community radio programming – the announcers during these times are unpaid volunteers.

The station first went to air on 4 October 1922, and celebrated 90 years in 2012. It has previously been known as 4DN, 4AB, 4ZB (not part of government ZB network), Pioneer Radio and 4XD. It has previously broadcast on 1431 AM and 1305 AM. The station was operated non-commercially and voluntarily by the Otago Radio Association until 1990. Then it became a commercial station and was sold to Radio Otago Limited in 1993, and subsequently became part of MediaWorks Radio.

On 6 May 2008 it began broadcasting on 99.8 FM and in mid-2007 it began online streaming. All programming is broadcast from studios in ASB House (formally Radio Otago House) in central Dunedin. In 2015 the FM frequency was moved to 106.7 FM (central city only) to make way for network station Magic. Radio Dunedin was not affected by the More FM rebranding.

Past stations

Networked closed down stations

Channel Z and Kiwi FM

Kiwi FM (originally known as Channel Z) was a New Zealand music station, the station originally played 100% music from New Zealand artists, this was reduced to 60% in 2012. Kiwi FM had its origins as Channel Z, a station that played mostly alternative rock music. Channel Z began as a local station in Wellington and separate stations were later started in Auckland and Christchurch.

In 2001, the Wellington and Christchurch stations became networked from Auckland and Channel Z saw a format change in 2003 to include 30% New Zealand music as well as a change of presenters. In 2005 Channel Z was relaunched as Kiwi FM a station that originally played 100% New Zealand music. From 2006 Kiwi used frequencies licensed by the New Zealand Government with the original frequencies assigned to other MediaWorks radio stations. Kiwi FM ceased broadcasting on 31 March 2015 with the frequencies handed back to the government.

Radio Live and Live Sport

Radio Live was a talkback radio station catered at the 35 – 54-year-old audience and LiveSport was a sports talk station aimed at the 40+ year-old male listeners. LiveSport was used to broadcast Radio Trackside during horse racing hours. Both stations have their origins as Radio Pacific which was an Auckland radio station that began in the 1970s, switched to a talkback format in the 1980s and was networked across all of New Zealand in the 1990s. Radio Live was initially started as new network in 2005 focusing on talkback and the Radio Pacific brand remained until 2007 also running talkback outside of the Radio Trackside hours. The two brands were consolidated into one in 2010. Radio Live was heard in 26 markets across New Zealand.

Radio Live ceased broadcasting on 18 January 2019 at midnight, and was replaced with Magic Talk at the same time.

Local closed down stations
The following stations were inherited by MediaWorks Radio as part of a merger and were later closed down or replaced with a networked station:
 Magic FM Northland – closed 2001 replaced with The Edge
 Fifeshire Classic Nelson – closed 1999 replaced with Solid Gold
 92FM Hawkes Bay – originally a MORE FM station, closed 1997 replaced with Solid Gold 
 C93FM Christchurch – closed 2001 replaced with Solid Gold
 Port FM Timaru - closed 2018 replaced with the Breeze and More FM

Local rebranded stations
The following stations were local stations across New Zealand purchased by MediaWorks Radio either as part of the merger with Radio Otago or as part of the purchase of other independent radio companies. Following the formation of RadioWorks these stations operated under the LocalWorks banner. In December 2004 these stations were either rebranded as MORE FM or The Breeze. Some stations listed were purchased by MediaWorks Radio after 2004 and subsequently rebranded.

More FM stations
The following stations originally had an adult contemporary music format or Hot AC music format and were rebranded as MORE FM: 
 KCC FM Northland
 Times FM Rodney – rebranded 2015
 Coromandel FM – rebranded 2015
 Coastline FM Tauranga
 Lakes 96FM Rotorua
 Energy FM Taranaki
 89 FM Gisborne – purchased 2005 rebranded same year.
 Hot 93 Hawkes Bay
 Star FM Wanganui
 2XS FM Manawatu
 Fifeshire FM Nelson
 Sounds FM Marlborough – purchased 2007 rebranded 2008.
 Port FM Timaru- purchased 2018 rebranded same year.
 Radio Central Central Otago
 Resort Radio Queenstown
 4XO Dunedin
 Big River Radio Balclutha
 Foveaux FM Southland

The Breeze stations
The following local stations were rebranded as The Breeze. Most stations originally played Easy Listening prior to the rebranding: 
 Y99.3 FM Waikato – rebranded 2003
 Magic 828 & 98.6FM Manawatu – rebranded 2004
 Easy FM Marlborough – purchased 2007 rebranded 2008.
 Lite FM Christchurch – rebranded 2004
 Q92 FM Queenstown – purchased 2006 rebranded same year.

Interactive

MediaWorks Interactive consists of the radio brands, corporate website and travel website Wandr. The Interactive department designs, maintains and sells advertising for all websites. Most websites have a similar layout and a MediaWorks link bar at the top of the page.

The Newshub website was the flagship news website of MediaWorks. On 1 December 2020, Newshub was acquired by Discovery, Inc. The website is continuously updated by the company's journalists. It claims to have provided the first video coverage and breaking news coverage of several events, including being the first website to have posted the verdict of the retrial of David Bain in 2009. It includes sections on national, world, sport, business, entertainment, politics, lifestyle, technology and odd news, as well as weather forecasts, information on Newshub programmes and a news forum. The other websites carry feeds from relevant sections.

Former logos

References

External links
 Mai FM Official Website
 Official Ruia Mai website
 Official George FM website
 Radio Dunedin Official website
 Radio Dunedin Listen Now (Live stream)
 Radio Dunedin RadioVault history
 RadioWorks Information Site About RadioLIVE
 Listen Live
 Media Works notice of Launch for BSport
 The Sound Official Website

Radio broadcasting companies of New Zealand